226th Brigade may refer to:
226th Infantry Brigade (United Kingdom)
226th Mixed Brigade (Spain)